The United States Air Force's 251st Cyberspace Engineering Installation Group (251 CEIG) is an Air National Guard engineering installation unit located at Springfield ANGB, Ohio. It is the oldest communications/cyber group in the USAF and was originally chartered at the 251st Mobile Communications Group.  The units assigned to the 251CEIG compromise 47.5% of the USAF's Engineering Installation capability and 47.5% of Department of Defenses Build and Extend Organic cyberspace infrastructure robust capability. The co-located 269th Combat Communications Squadron is also assigned to the 251st and is the USAF's Oldest Mobile Communications Squadrons rooted as the 1077th Signal Company Army Air Corps founded in March 1942.  The Group Headquarters has 38 personnel assigned with a wartime mission to augment Major Command AFFOR staffs, Joint Force Commander staffs, Numbered Air Forces Warfighting Headquarters staffs or any Combatant Commanders cyber and Communications forward staff function.

Mission
The mission of the 251st CEIG is to command, organize, equip, train and administer assigned and attached forces to ensure complete mission readiness in support of emergency USAF requirements, and to provide timely and reliable communications engineering and installation in support of state emergencies.

History
Headquarters, 251st Combat Communications Group (CCG) was constituted at Springfield, Ohio, on 5 October 1952. Commanded by Major Charles R. Stahl, the Headquarters had an initial strength of five people. Of the existing ANG communications groups and five active duty groups, the 251CCG is the oldest, and it is also the parent unit of two other ANG combat communications groups: The 226CCG in Alabama and the 254CCG in Texas. At its inception, the group had twelve subordinate units in Ohio, North Carolina, Missouri, Illinois, Texas, Alabama, and Arkansas. The mission of the 251st initially was a composite of the missions of today's Engineering –
Installation Squadrons and Combat Communications Squadrons. While the organization was charged with providing, installing, operating, and maintaining communications equipment for deployed flying units, it did so from "scratch", with a greater variety of small components than today's relatively complete tactical capabilities. Beginning in 1953, the headquarters planned and directed Group-Wide Exercises at locations across the country, beginning with Annual Training at Stewart AFB, New York, in August of that year. In 1954, the organization was authorized with its first full-time officer Air Technician: Capt (later Lt Col) Herbert E. Moore. In that year, the headquarters strength increased to nine officers and nine enlisted personnel. The 251st started remissioning into a Cyberspace Engineering Installation Group in 2010.  The current mission of the Headquarters, 251CEIG is to command, organize, equip, train and administer assigned and attached forces to ensure readiness in order to provide communications engineering and installation services to support emergency USAF requirements and to provide a staff element for management of Communications and Electronics (C-E) personnel when deployed in support of Air Force taskings.

To train for its wartime mission, the 251CEIG has been deploying to Exercises since 1976, with its first overseas exercise involvement occurring in 1978. Since its first deployment to these Joint Command System (JCS) and overseas exercises, the 251CEIG has deployed personnel and equipment to Korea, the European Theater, the US Southern Command, and to South West Asia. During Operation DESERT SHIELD and Operation DESERT STORM, the 251st provided over 1,500 workdays in voluntary direct support, both in the Area of Responsibility (AOR) and in back-fill roles stateside.

Today, the 251st manages all ANG EI AEF and JCS Request for Forces (RFF) taskings, T10 and T32 workload for the ANG EI community.  Currently, six partial mobilization's are underway moving forces to multiple areas of responsibility.  Additionally, 100 or so projects are completed yearly at a 65% cost saving over non-organic blue-suit contractors.

Assignments

Major Command/Gaining Command
Air National Guard/Air Combat Command (2018–Present)
Air National Guard/Air Force Space Command (2009-2018)
Air National Guard/Air Combat Command (1992-2009)
Air National Guard/Tactical Air Command (1971-1992)

Previous designations
 251st Combat Communications Group (1952-2010)

Squadrons assigned
269th Combat Communications Squadron - OH
130th Engineering Installation Squadron - UT
205th Engineering Installation Squadron - OK
210 Engineering Installation Squadron - MN
214th Engineering Installation Squadron - LA
219th Engineering Installation Squadron - OK
220th Engineering Installation Squadron - OH
272nd Engineering Installation Squadron - TX

Bases stationed
Springfield ANGB, Ohio (1952–Present)

Commanders
Colonel Steven Dudash (2022-Present)
Colonel Francisco Dominguez (2019–2022)
Colonel Wade D. Rupper (2016–2019)
Colonel Norman A. Poklar (2003 – 2016)
Col Robert A. Meyer (1996–2003)
Col William R. Reilly (1992–1996)
Col Henry S. Youd (1989–1992)
Col David F. Howard (1983–1989)
Col Richard E. Bennett (1982–1983)<
Col Pasquale A. Gicale (1968–1982)
Col Charles R. Stahl (1952–1968)

Decorations
Air Force Outstanding Unit Award 
2007, 2009, 2012, 2014, 2016, 2018
2005
1 Aug 1999-31 Jul 2001
1 Apr 1997-31 Mar 1999
1 Jan 1991-31 Dec 1993
1987
1982
1975
1973

Awards
NGAUS Non-Fly Most Outstanding Mission Support Unit Trophy (over 600 ANG mission support units are eligible to compete).
2012, 2016, 2017, 2019
NGAUS Distinguished Mission Support Plaque Award (Top 5 ANG units selected)
2007, 2010, 2011, 2018
Tappen Trophy for Most Outstanding Unit in the State of Ohio
1980
McClelland Award for Most Outstanding C-E Unit in the USAF
1980
ANG Info Dominance Major General Harold M. McClelland Large Unit of the Year, MAJCOM Winner (Large Unit - 126+)
2010, 2011, 2012, 2013, 2014, 2015, 2016, 2018 and 2019
 Info Dominance: Major General Harold M. McClelland Large Unit of the Year, USAF Winner
 2020
General Mark Welsh Team Award
2011 for AFRL Radar Moves (USAF Runner-up)
General Mark Welsh One Team Award Nominee
2017 USSTRATCOM and 14AF
2018 NGB 
Hungarian Defense Force Outstanding Unit Award
1999
NGB ANG Communications Systems Achievement Award
1992
Colonel Pasquale A. Gicale Outstanding Support Unit in the State of Ohio
1990
1995
1996
1997
1999
2003
2006
2007
2008 (Award discontinued by OH ANG in 2008)
Individual Readiness Award Geographically Separated Unit (GSU) in the State of Ohio
2007
Mission Readiness Award GSU in the State of Ohio
2008

References

External links

Combat Communications 0251
Combat Communications 0251
Military units and formations in Ohio